Slip is the debut studio album by American post-hardcore band Quicksand, released February 9, 1993 through Polydor Records. "Omission" and "Unfulfilled" first appeared on their 1990 self-titled EP. Slip was well received by music critics and is now considered a classic in the post-hardcore and alternative metal genres, influencing many acts including Torche and Deftones.

The lead single off the album, "Fazer", became a college radio hit. The album was reissued on vinyl in 2012, through Dine Alone Records and Shop Radio Cast. The reissue featured a cover of The Smiths song "How Soon Is Now?".

On February 3, 2023, Quicksand announced a 30th Anniversary Edition of their debut LP "Slip" being re-issued on vinyl by the Boston based record label Iodine Recordings. The 30th Anniversary Edition of "Slip" also included a 64-page hardcover book with band photographs, rare concert posters, and a foreword by Walter Schreifels. The book also contains commentary from notable musicians from the punk scene, including: Scott Ian of Anthrax, Geoff Rickly of Thursday, Stephen Brodsky of Cave In, Dennis Lyxzén of Refused, Tim McIlrath of Rise Against, and many more. The record was also remastered for vinyl using the original 1993 master tapes.

Critical reception

The album generally received positive reviews from music critics. AllMusic senior critic Stephen Thomas Erlewine wrote: "Quicksand's music is about powerful anger, and the persistent, bludgeoning Slip delivers the goods." Gina Arnold of Entertainment Weekly stated: "Quicksand is derivative, but at least its operative influences — Helmet and Fugazi — are highly agreeable ones." BBC's Alex Deller  described the record as a "40-minute master class in post-hardcore perfection."

The album is included in Decibel magazine's Hall of Fame.

Accolades 

* denotes an unordered list

Track listing

Album credits 
Album credits as adapted from Artistdirect:
Quicksand
Walter Schreifels – vocals, guitar
Tom Capone – guitar
Sergio Vega – bass
Alan Cage – drums

Additional
George Marino – remastering
Andrew Smith – assistant engineer
Fran Flannery – assistant engineer
Phil Yarnall – design
John Mockus – photography
Mike Thompson – assistant engineer
Quicksand – main performer
Alex Brown – cover art concept
Edward Douglas – assistant engineer
Don Fury – producer, engineer
Steve Haigler – producer, mixing, engineer
Jesse Henderson – assistant engineer

References

1993 debut albums
Quicksand (band) albums
Polydor Records albums
Albums produced by Don Fury
Albums recorded at Long View Farm